Reid A. Railton (1895–1977) was a British automotive engineer, and designer of land and water speed record vehicles.

Biography
Reid Antony Railton was the son of a Manchester stockbroker: Charles Withingon Railton and his wife Charlotte Elizabeth (née Sharman), Reid was born in Chorley, Alderley Edge, Cheshire and was christened on 13 August 1895 at the local parish church. He was educated at Rugby School and Manchester University.  He joined Leyland Motors in 1917 where he worked with J.G. Parry-Thomas on the Leyland Eight luxury car. He left in 1922 to set up the  Arab Motor Company where he was chief designer. Only about twelve cars were built, of which two low-chassis cars survive. One is in the Isle of Man and the other one (chassis number 6, engine number 10, registration UW 2) is now in Austria having been rebuilt and rebodied by David Barker in the early 1990s.

In 1927, on the death of his friend Parry-Thomas, Railton closed the Arab factory and moved to Brooklands working for Thomson & Taylor becoming their Technical Director with responsibility for John Cobb's 1933 Napier Railton car which took the Outer Circuit record in 1933 and Sir Malcolm Campbell's Blue Bird Land Speed Record cars of 1931 to 1935. He also tuned the Hudson chassis used on the Railton car, named after him.

As well as cars he designed high-speed boats, including the jet-powered Crusader in which John Cobb was killed in 1952 while travelling in excess of  attempting to break the Water Speed Record.

In 1939 he moved to California to work for the Hall-Scott Motor Company. He died in Berkeley, California, in 1977 at the age of 82.

Vehicles designed by Reid Railton
 Campbell-Napier-Railton Blue Bird
 Campbell-Railton Blue Bird
 Crusader (speedboat)
 Leyland Eight
 Napier-Railton
 Railton Mobil Special
 Railton Special

See also

 Railton (car)
 Vehicles designed by Reid Railton

References

Further reading

External links 
 The Auto Channel
 

British automobile designers
Brooklands people
People educated at Rugby School
1895 births
1977 deaths
Land speed record people
British expatriates in the United States